The Tangbunia Bank (widely misreported as Tari Bunia) is a bank run by the Turaga indigenous movement on Pentecost Island in Vanuatu. It is notable for dealing in items of customary wealth such as hand-woven mats, shells or pig tusks rather than currency such as the vatu. Accounts at the bank are reckoned in livatu, a unit equivalent to the value of one fully curved boar's tusk.

The Tangbunia Bank has fourteen branches throughout the island, with its headquarters at Lavatmanggemu. The bank's manager is Chief Viraleo Boborenvanua. It was set up in accordance with the national government's support for the indigenous customary economy, in a country where a majority of the population does not participate extensively in a monetary economy. According to the British Broadcasting Corporation, the bank is similar to other banks in that it has "accounts, reserves, cheque books and tight security".

The bank is named after the giant baskets in which valuables were traditionally stored.

Record-keeping at the Tangbunia bank is done using Avoiuli, a local writing system devised by Chief Viraleo.

References

Banks of Vanuatu
Vanuatuan culture